After the Bomb may refer to:
After the Bomb (novel), a 1985 novel by Gloria D. Miklowitz
After the Bomb (game), a 1986 role-playing game supplement and 2001 complete RPG published by Palladium Books